Nemobius sylvestris, the wood cricket, is a flightless species of cricket in the family Gryllidae. It is native to Western Europe and North Africa but uncommon in Britain.

Description
This cricket is a small, dark brown, ground-dwelling, grasshopper-like insect with long, thread-like antennae. Neither males nor females have hind wings; in males the fore-wings extend half way along the abdomen, while in females, the fore-wings are reduced to rounded stubs. Females also have a long ovipositor at the tip of the abdomen.

Distribution and habitat
The wood cricket is native to Europe and North Africa. Its range includes Western, Central and Southern Europe, Corsica, Algeria and Morocco. The natural habitat of this species is forest edges and woodland clearings, where it is associated with oak, beech, hazel and holly trees and with bracken. It thrives among the leaf litter in warm, sunny spots. It is uncommon in Britain, with separate populations in the New Forest, the Isle of Wight and southern Devon.

Ecology
Wood crickets live among the decaying leaf litter on which they feed. They may also consume the fungus growing among the litter. When the weather is hot enough, males stridulate (sing) during both day and night. The loud two tone call is difficult to pinpoint, especially when several are calling in close proximity. When disturbed, these crickets leap away with their powerful back limbs, or hide in the leaf litter or among low vegetation.

Eggs are laid in the leaf litter in summer and autumn and the crickets overwinter as eggs or as nymphs, with the young maturing in June. Unusually for insects in the grasshopper family, wood crickets survive for two years. Dispersal along the edge of woodland is more possible.

References

External links
Friday Fellow: Wood Cricket at Earthling Nature

Ground crickets
Orthoptera of Africa
Orthoptera of Europe
Insects described in 1792
Taxa named by Louis Augustin Guillaume Bosc